Oiceoptoma rugulosum is a species of carrion beetle in the family Silphidae.  It is found in North America.

References

Further reading

 
 
 

Silphidae
Beetles described in 1903